Kemisetso Baloyi (born 8 March 1998) is a South African rugby sevens player.

Baloyi has been playing rugby since she was 15. In 2022, she helped the Delta Drone Tuks team win the Centrales Sevens tournament in France.

Baloyi was named in South Africa's squad for the 2022 Commonwealth Games in Birmingham where they finished seventh overall.

References 

Living people
1998 births
Female rugby sevens players
South Africa international women's rugby sevens players
Rugby sevens players at the 2022 Commonwealth Games